Dungarvan CBS is a secondary school in Dungarvan, County Waterford, Ireland. It was founded in 1807, and is one of the oldest Christian Brothers schools in the world. As of 2018, over 300 students were enrolled in the school. As of mid-2022, the principal was Agnes Guerin. Dungarvan CBS supports the Junior Cycle and Senior Cycle curriculum, and also offers an optional Transition Year programme.

Notable alumni
 Jamie Costin, Olympic race walker

References

External links
 
 TY-Admissions-Policy-2016

Secondary schools in County Waterford
Congregation of Christian Brothers secondary schools in the Republic of Ireland
1807 establishments in Ireland
Educational institutions established in 1807